Ghaznavi (also Romanized as Ghaznavī, Qaznavī, and Ghoznavī; also known as Qowzdovī, Qozdovī, Qūz Davī, and Qūzdovī) is a village in Cheshmeh Saran Rural District, Cheshmeh Saran District, Azadshahr County, Golestan Province, Iran. At the 2006 census, its population was 80, in 20 families.

References 

Populated places in Azadshahr County